Ilmalya (Elmäle) is a rural locality (a village) in Baishevsky Selsoviet, Zianchurinsky District, Bashkortostan, Russia. The population was 205 as of 2010. There are 3 streets.

Geography 
Ilmalya is located 96 km southeast of Isyangulovo (the district's administrative centre) by road. Baishevo is the nearest rural locality.

References 

Rural localities in Zianchurinsky District